Ken Block (1967–2023) was an American rally driver and co-founder of DC Shoes.

Ken Block may also refer to:

 Ken Block (ice hockey) (born 1944), Canadian ice hockey player
 Ken Block (politician) (born 1965), American founder of the Moderate Party of Rhode Island; candidate for Governor of Rhode Island
 Ken Block, American musician from the rock band Sister Hazel
 Kenneth Paul Block (1924–2009), American fashion illustrator